Russell Rhea (born July 31, 1962 in Phoenix, Arizona) is a former television journalist best known for his reporting on Texas National Guard missions in Bosnia and Central America and is currently a public relations executive in Austin, Texas. Rhea grew up in  Rancho Palos Verdes, California and is a 1981 graduate of Rolling Hills High School. He graduated from the Walter Cronkite School of Journalism at Arizona State University in 1985 and began his television career at KYEL-TV in Yuma, Arizona. After 3 years as a reporter and host of PM Magazine at KWQC-TV in Davenport, Iowa, Rhea moved to KXAN-TV in Austin, Texas, where he spent 10 years as a morning show host, weathercaster and reporter.  In 1987, the Texas National Guard invited Rhea to report on their activities in Bosnia; his reports from Sarajevo won several awards.

Rhea left television in 2000 and joined  Hahn, Texas Communications (formerly TateAustinHahn) . In addition to leading media efforts on a number of public issues elections in Texas, Rhea has won numerous public relations industry awards for video production and conducts TateAustinHahn's spokesperson training program.

References

External links
  Hahn, Texas Communications

1962 births
Living people
Walter Cronkite School of Journalism and Mass Communication alumni
Television personalities from Phoenix, Arizona
People from Austin, Texas
People from Rancho Palos Verdes, California